Our Lady of Salvation, also known as Our Lady of Light, is a Catholic title of the Blessed Virgin Mary. The devotion to Our Lady of Salvation is based on a wooden statue of the Virgin Mary that was first venerated in Joroan (now part of Tiwi, Albay) in the Philippines.

The image was canonically crowned 25 August 1976 by Cardinal Jaime Sin. The former Bishop of Legazpi, Teotimo Pacis y Cruel declared the image as the patroness of Albay province.

Description
The original, 18th-century image of Our Lady of Salvation reflects her role, according to Catholic doctrine, as Co-Redemptrix. The Virgin is portrayed as carrying the Christ Child in her left arm, while her right arm grasps a man by the wrist as he is about to fall into a gaping Hellmouth. An angel kneels at the foot of the Virgin, offering a basket of burning hearts to Christ, who holds a burning heart in his right hand, while his left hand is stretched in a gesture of accepting the hearts.

History

Much of the history regarding the statue of the Lady of Salvation and the Marian devotion centered on it rely heavily on the written accounts, based on tradition, of the first parish priest of Joroan, Rev Lamberto S. Fulay (1919–1935), in his booklet An Kasaysayan Kan Ladawan Ni Birhen de Salvacion.

The Calpi tree
According to the Fulay account, in the 1770s a certain haciendero named Don Silverio Arcilla of Buhi, assigned a tenant farmer called Mariano Dacoba, to one of his vast estates in Joroan (once known as Cagnipa), which was a satellite barrio of Buhi. While Dacoba was clearing parts of Arcilla's hacienda one day, he chopped down a big Calpi tree. Although already severed at the base, the tree's leaves did not wilt and maintained its life and freshness. The tenant informed Arcilla about it, and the latter consulted with the pastor of Buhi.

A certain sculptor called Bagacumba was commissioned by the pastor of Buhi to carve an image from the Calpi trunk that Dacoba had found. Three images were carved out of the wood: that of Our Lady of Salvation, one of Our Lady of Solitude, and that of Saint Anthony of Padua. On 25 August 1776, the image of Our Lady of Salvation was lent to Joroan on condition that the village's residents build a chapel at the centre of their barrio. Consequently, a certain Sotera Cababag was assigned as the chapel's Hermana Mayor, in charge of caring for the image.

The 1853 agreement
Buhi was initially the image's rightful owner as Arcilla (who owned the land the statue's wood came from), the parish priest who had it commissioned, and the sculptor were all from the town. On 21 January 1853, Buhi and Joroan had an agreement transferring rights over the image to the latter. Buhi's parish priest and Gobernadorcillo, Rev Antonio Guadalajara and Mariano Buenaflor, respectively, made the pact with Joroan's barrio lieutenants. In accordance with the agreement, Buhi surrendered all its rights over the image if the people of Joroan made an offering of fifty pesos, and an additional twenty-five for a bell.

Miracles

First miracle
Joroan, according to Fulay, was often the target of Muslim marauders due to its proximity to the sea. During an attack, the people of Joroan would flock to the image and pray to the Virgin for protection. Tradition notes that Muslims pillaging Joroan would constantly fail to ignite houses, and this was attributed to the Virgin.

Deliverance of Hermana Tiray
The second miracle was when a Hermana Mayor known only as Tiray was captured in a Moro raid. After a year of being held captive in Sulu, Tiray fell into a deep sleep and upon waking up, had realised that she was not in her quarters but was standing in an unknown forest. She then saw in a strange, white deer in the woods, which she, out of curiosity, followed through the mountains until she lost sight of it. Tiray discovered that she had already been miraculously transported to Legazpi, and was now only 38 km away from Joroan. After this incident, the people of Joroan moved the chapel further away from the sea to a higher location in the mountains, in order to avoid its desecration by raiders.

Apparition

The third miracle was an apparition of Our Lady of Salvation. Four devotees from the island of Catanduanes went on a pilgrimage to Joroan, bringing along with them a set of beeswax candles which they intended to offer at the shrine. Upon reaching shore, three of them made a detour to Buhi to light candles for Saint Anthony, while the fourth pilgrim was left to guard their boat. As the fourth man strolled along the beach at dusk, he met a woman carrying her child. The woman asked him for a candle that she may light her way home to the mountains, as it was almost dark. The man refused since the candle was not his, but the woman was insistent and promised that she would return the candle the next morning if he would come to her house uphill. Out of generosity, the man acquiesced to the lady, who told him he can the next day enquire where she lived from the town lieutenant of Joroan, so that she can return him his candle.

The next day, the man did as he was told, but the town lieutenant did not know where the mysterious lady lived. The lieutenant referred the pilgrim to the Hermana Mayor, who was also of no help, save for advising the man to seek divine guidance at the chapel of Our Lady of Salvation. Upon arriving at the chapel, the pilgrim was surprised when, at the foot of the image, lay unused and unlit exactly the same candle which he had lent the mysterious lady the day before. Upon seeing that the image resembled the mysterious woman, the man was filled with compunction. and after leaving the candle alone, prostrated and asked the Virgin to pray for his sins.

Final Muslim raid

The fourth miracle attributed to Our Lady of Salvation occurred during the years that a Dominga de los Reyes succeeded Tiray as Hermana Mayor. While on one of their raids, the Moro pirates were said to have retreated almost immediately after seeing a vision of heavily armed men. The vision was said to have traumatised the raiders so much that it was the last Muslim attack on the shores of Joroan.

The Boat
On the eve of the feast of Our Lady of Salvation in 1884, a group from the Partido was sailing to Joroan when a whirlwind attacked the boat. Giant waves almost capsized their boat, which suddenly regained its balance. Even though they were almost dumped into the water, the passengers' clothes were completely dry as though freshly ironed. The people in the boat attributed their escape from death to Our Lady of Salvation.

Boundary dispute
In the late 19th century, a territorial dispute arose over whether Joroan was governed from Buhi in Ambos Camarines, or Tiwi in Albay. A Captain Vera of Albay, however, argued that Tiwi's proximity to Joroan gave it rightful jurisdiction. Vera won the case, and Joroan was annexed by Tiwi, becoming a part of Albay Province till the present.

Construction of a new church
Joroan became very peaceful in the 1860s, as the boundary dispute was resolved, and the Muslims no longer attacked the barrio. During this time, Doña Clara de Vera, the wife of a certain landlord named Don Vicente de Vera, became the image's Hermana Mayor. Doña Clara vowed to care for the image until her death, and financed its silver and gold plating.

Unsatisfied with her lifetime service, De Vera initiated constriction of a new church at the centre of Joroan. In her eagerness to construct, she sought the help of her friend, Doña Saturnina de Bayot of Tabaco, to finance the project. Another acquaintance, Don Manuel Casa of Manila, also contributed greatly, sending the needed materials and an architect. During the long trip to Joroan, the architect Casa had dispatched fell seriously ill, and men had to support him as he supervised construction. After a great deal of pain, the architect was suddenly cured on the ninth day of his work.

Disputes with Tiwi

Traslación
After the church was finished, the image was translated from the mountain chapel to the new shrine, beginning the annual custom of the image's traslación to Tiwi.

The people of Tiwi were also ardent devotees of Our Lady of Salvation. Tradition gives account that whenever the fiesta in Tiwi was approaching, the parish priest would personally retrieve the image from Joroan. The arrival of the image in Tiwi was a moment of great rejoicing, and a band would accompany its entry into the town.

The practice was cut short by the typhoon that devastated Joroan in 1895. The chapel was completely destroyed, but the image was miraculously still standing intact on its pedestal. The people of Joroan reconstructed half of the chapel from the debris, but later on everything deteriorated. A long and bitter rift between the peoples of Joroan and Tiwi began, and since the former was under the rule of the latter, Rev Francisco Borondia took the image to Tiwi until a proper chapel was built in Joroan.

This meant that the direction of the traslación was reversed, and it was now the people of Joroan who borrowed the image during fiestas— an arrangement they greatly resented. They almost lost their right to it; that is why they had spent a lot of time, effort, and money to recover it, and had to inevitably incur the ire of the people of Tiwi.

Disputes with Ricardo Sayson

In 1917, Joroan planned to hold a grand celebration from the beginning of the novena honouring the image up to a few days after the fiesta. On the ninth day, the people of Joroan requested of Rev Ricardo Sayson, the Tiwi parish priest, that the image be allowed to stay a little longer in Joroan so that might make further homage to the Virgin. Sayson refused, and arrogantly taunted the people, daring them to file a complaint at court.

The people of Joroan drafted a letter to Most Rev John Bernard McGinley, Bishop of Nueva Cáceres, requesting designation of a separate pastor for Joroan. Pedro Colar I and Lino Clutario were tasked to deliver the request, and immediately set out for the see in Naga, but turned back since McGinley was visiting Albay. The emissaries overtook McGinley in Iriga, but the bishop refused to discuss the matter there, suggesting that they talk about it in Malinao on 17 November 1917. On the appointed date, Joroan again sent Clutario, this time with Miguel Diolata, and the brothers Felipe and Lorenzo Clutario.

Lino Clutario was the group's spokesman, as he had the best command of English. During their audience, Clutario told Bishop McGinley that Joroan wanted a separate pastor for their barrio, and that the image of Our Lady of Salvation be ordered returned to them. The Bishop declined the first request due to a lack of priests in his diocese, but contemplated on the second with the order of the verification of the origin of the image. Another audience was set for two days later, this time with Tiwi as the venue, but nothing favourable for the people of Joroan resulted from the conference. The issue was brought to court, with Narciso Cultivo spearheading the case of the real owner of the image, and Domingo Imperial as lawyer. The civil court however deemed it an ecclesiastical matter and soon dropped it, endorsing the case to Bishop McGinley.

Creation of Joroan Parish
In 1918, Rev. Tomás Bernales succeeded Sayson as pastor of Tiwi. Bishop McGinley authorised him to settle the dispute with Joroan. In May of that year, Councilor Alfajara and Lieutenant Cultivo of Joroan met with Bernales, and both sides agreed that Joroan was to become a separate parish covering Sogod, Matalibong, Bariis, Maynonong, Misibis, Dapdap, and Mayong. Bishop McGinley was informed of the agreement, and named Rev. Lamberto S. Fulay as its first parish priest. The Parish of Joroan was canonically erected on 18 September 1919, with Fulay assuming duties as curé on 8 October.

The image of the Lady of Salvation was still in Tiwi, so in accordance with the 1918 agreement, another Traslación was scheduled for 20 November 1919. Joroan Church had no proper paraphernalia for the time being, so Bernales lent some of his things, while donations began to pour in from all over Albay to the newly established parish.

The images was greeted with fireworks as its boat docked at Joroan, and there great jubilation among the townsfolk. Early the next morning, a solemn High Mass was celebrated with a huge number of pilgrims from all over the Bicolandia in attendance. Also present were the Vicar Forane; the pastors of Tiwi, Tabaco, and Nabua; the Governor of Albay; the board members of the Provincial Government; the Municipal President; the Municipal Council; and other prominent people.

Episcopal Decree of 1919
Among the terms of agreement made when Joroan was raised to the status of parish was the Episcopal Decree Constandoonos of 18 September 1919.  The decree states that:

Although already a parish by now, Joroan still had several issues. The Decree was no guarantee that the image was now fully in Joroan's possession, so a committee was organised with the purpose of appealing to Bishop McGinley for the Decree's revision and removal of the clause “except for a span of fifteen days”. McGinley rejected the request by further stating that the Decree is part of the terms of agreement for the elevation of Joroan to the status of a parish, and that its representatives signed it.

Rising tensions
In 1920, Joroan was reminded to comply with the Decree. The people however, were still adamant for fear that something unfavourable might happen and majority of the people, especially the women, no longer favoured the idea of lending the image of the Lady of Salvation to Tiwi. This prompted Bishop McGinley to dispatch to Joroan Fr. Luis Dimaruba, a priest vested with ecclesiastical authority, to advise the people regarding their insolence, and to persuade them about the urgency of lending the image to Tiwi since the fiesta was approaching. However, it was only after the encouragement and assurance of the image’s return by their parish priest that led the people to reluctantly lend Tiwi the image.

On 6 August 1920, a cohort with Bernales leading them, arrived in Joroan to take the image. Before the image was taken, Bernales reassured the people that the image shall be returned after fifteen days. The absence of the image in the altar of their church made the people of Joroan so anxious that they never lost track of the fifteen-day promise. However, realizing that Tiwi had not yet returned the image even though the fifteen-day agreement had already expired, the people dispatched a big boat to Tiwi so that they could remind Bernales that the agreement had already expired and also to personally get the image.

The August Riot
When Fulay greeted Bernales, the later was compelled to return the image. A huge number of people from Tiwi were present in the church to bid the image farewell. However, when the image was about to be handed over to Fulay, one of the onlookers screamed and seized the image from Bernales. The visitors from Joroan cried foul and rioting ensued.

The message was clear: the people of Tiwi refused to give back the image by violently declaring that the image was theirs. This claim is backed by the alleged testimony of the elders of Tiwi that the image in question was just a copy of the original: the copy belonged to Tiwi, while the original was Joroan’s. Folklore held that in those days there was an antique image of Our Lady of Salvation, and that the image’s Hermana Mayor was a certain Mitay. When it was still in a good condition it used to be brought down to the chapel whenever the image was in Tiwi, but that this has already been deteriorated with age. The people of Joroan abandoned it, and that the title of Our Lady of Salvation which the present image now bears originated from this antique image.

Final settlement
Fulay, seeing that the brawl would do no good, advised his parishioners to go home instead. He then wrote a letter to Bishop McGinley about the heightened tensions between the peoples of Joroan and Tiwi. In response, McGinley reassured Joroan that the image will be returned to them. Owing to the previous rioting, the image was kept in the house of Vicente Vera for more than a month, and it was only on 28 September of that year that the image was returned to Joroan.

To prevent future violence, Bishop McGinley on 18 August 1920 declared that:

To keep the ardour of the same Marian devotion in Tiwi and to prevent further tensions, McGinley also permitted the creation of a replica for Tiwi. The original image has been permanently enshrined in Joroan since 1920.

Later years

Canonical coronation
On 8 December 1975, Teotimo Pacis, the Bishop of Legazpi, formally declared the Virgin Mary, under the title of Our Lady of Salvation, as the heavenly patroness of Albay. In 1976, the Diocese formally celebrated the Bicentennial Jubilee of its patroness. One of the projects during the Bicentennial was the completion of the shrine. The original design of the shrine was the handiwork of Juanito Pelea of Tiwi, but was later redesigned and finished under the supervision of Fidel Siapno of Legazpi City. After its completion, Bishop Pacis blessed the shrine on 21 August 1976. The Archbishop of Manila, Cardinal Jaime Sin Canonically crowned Our Lady of Salvation, while the Joroan Church was proclaimed a Diocesan shrine on 25 August 1976.

Veneration
Every year, during the month of August until September, devotees from all over the Bicol Region visit the shrine of the Lady of Salvation in Joroan. The last Saturday of August is traditionally reserved as a special day of veneration wherein pilgrims would walk in a procession for 9 km from the St. Lawrence Church of Tiwi to the Diocesan Shrine in Joroan.

In Barangay Pasadena, San Juan, Metro Manila, the image is fêted on the third weekend of May with a Mass and procession.
 
In Caridad, Culasi, Antique, the barrio fiesta is celebrated every end of the month of May. It starts on the "bisperas" mass or the eve of the fiesta mass on May 28 and the fiesta proper is on May 29. The new image of Nuestra Senora de Salvacion was donated by the Cadiena-Española Family.

In the little barrio of Guinbanga-an, Laua-an also in the province of Antique the people of the barrio celebrated their yearly fiesta every month of November 25–26, they celebrated the fiesta with a procession and fiesta mass every November 26. The new Images of Nuestra Señora de Salvacion was donated by the Heirs of Tongcua-Luces Family, by their apos in the 4th and 5th Generation the Berte-Dolendo-Pepatco-Samillano Family of Barangay Guinbangga-an, Laua-an, Antique

Gallery

References

Notes

Citations

Bibliography
de Leon, Lorenzo. History of the Image of Our Lady of Salvation. Legazpi City, 1988
Barcelona, Mary Anne. Ynang Maria: A Celebration of the Blessed Virgin Mary in the Philippines. Edited by Consuelo B. Estepa, Ph.D. Pasig: Anvil Publishing, Inc, 2004.

Marian apparitions
Shrines to the Virgin Mary
Titles of Mary
Religion in Albay
Catholic Church in the Philippines
Statues of the Madonna and Child